1960 Guisan, provisional designation , is a carbonaceous asteroid from the middle region of the asteroid belt, approximately 25 kilometers in diameter.

It was discovered on 25 October 1973, by astronomer Paul Wild at Zimmerwald Observatory near Bern, Switzerland, and named after Swiss General Henri Guisan.

Orbit and classification 

Guisan orbits the Sun in the central main-belt at a distance of 2.2–2.8 AU once every 4.02 years (1,467 days). Its orbit has an eccentricity of 0.12 and an inclination of 8° with respect to the ecliptic.

Physical characteristics 

Guisan has been characterized as a dark C-type asteroid.

It has a rotation period of 8.46 hours and a geometric albedo of 0.04–0.05, as measured by the IRAS, Akari, WISE and NEOWISE surveys.

Naming 

This minor planet was named in memory of Henri Guisan (1874–1960), general of the Swiss army during the Second World War. He was notably from the country's smaller Swiss-French part rather than from the German-speaking part. The official  was published by the Minor Planet Center on 18 April 1977.

References

External links 
 Asteroid Lightcurve Database (LCDB), query form (info )
 Dictionary of Minor Planet Names, Google books
 Asteroids and comets rotation curves, CdR – Observatoire de Genève, Raoul Behrend
 Discovery Circumstances: Numbered Minor Planets (1)-(5000) – Minor Planet Center
 
 

001960
Guisan
Named minor planets
19731025